Maya TV, also known as Canal 66, is a television station in Honduras.

External links

Maya TV at LyngSat Address
Maya TV Canal 66 Live on Honduras 504

References

Television in Honduras